Annalen der Physik (English: Annals of Physics) is one of the oldest scientific journals on physics; it has been published since 1799. The journal publishes original, peer-reviewed papers on experimental, theoretical, applied, and mathematical physics and related areas. The editor-in-chief is Stefan Hildebrandt. Prior to 2008, its ISO 4 abbreviation was Ann. Phys. (Leipzig), after 2008 it became Ann. Phys. (Berl.).

The journal has been published under a variety of names (Wiedemann's Annalen der Physik und Chemie) during its history.

History
Originally,  was published in German, then a leading scientific language. From the 1950s to the 1980s, the journal published in both German and English. Initially, only foreign authors contributed articles in English but from the 1970s German-speaking authors increasingly wrote in English in order to reach an international audience. After the German reunification in 1990, English became the only language of the journal.

The importance of  unquestionably peaked in 1905 with Albert Einstein's Annus Mirabilis papers. In the 1920s, the journal lost ground to the concurrent Zeitschrift für Physik. With the 1933 emigration wave, German-language journals lost many of their best authors. During Nazi Germany, it was considered to represent "the more conservative elements within the German physics community", alongside Physikalische Zeitschrift. Between 1944 and 1946 publication ceased due to World War II.  Granted permission to restart by Soviet military authorities in August 1946, the journal subsequently maintained a policy until 1992 of co-editorship by one person from East Germany and one from West Germany. After German reunification, the journal was acquired by Wiley-VCH.

A relaunch of the journal with new editor and new contents was announced for 2012. As a result of the 2012 relaunch,  changed scope and updated the membership of the editorial board.

Editors
The early editors-in-chief were:
 Johann Christian Poggendorff (1824–1876) (as )
 Gustav Heinrich Wiedemann (1877–1899) (as )
 Paul Karl Ludwig Drude (1900–1906) (as )
With each editor, the numbering of volumes restarted from 1 (co-existent with a continuous numbering, a perpetual source of confusion). The journal was often referred to by the editor's name: Gilberts Annalen, Poggendorfs Annalen, Wiedemanns Annalen and so on, or for short Pogg. Ann., Wied. Ann.

After Drude, the work was divided between two editors: experimentalists Wilhelm Wien (1907–1928) and Eduard Grüneisen (1929–1949) and theoretician Max Planck (1907–1943, who had been associate editor from 1895).

In these times, peer-review was not yet standard. Einstein, for example, just sent his manuscripts to Planck, who then published them.

Notable published works
Some of the most famous papers published in Annalen der Physik were:
 on solving for the currents in an electronic circuit by Gustav Kirchhoff (1847),
 on stretched exponential relaxation by Rudolf Kohlrausch  (1854), 
 on stretched exponential relaxation by Friedrich Kohlrausch  (1863,1876),
 on the photoelectric effect by Heinrich Hertz (1887),
 on the theory of blackbody radiation by Max Planck (1901),
 on capillarity by Albert Einstein (1901),
 the Annus Mirabilis papers by Albert Einstein on photons, on Brownian motion, on mass–energy equivalence, and on the special theory of relativity, (1905)
 on the heat capacities of solids with quantized energy levels by Einstein (1907),
 on molecular motion near absolute zero by Einstein and Otto Stern (1913),
 on the general theory of relativity by Einstein (1916)

Abstracting and indexing
The journal is abstracted and indexed in:

According to the Journal Citation Reports, the journal has a 2015 impact factor of 3.443, ranking it 11th out of 79 journals in the category "Physics Multidisciplinary".

See also
List of physics journals

References

External links

Early issues from the 1800s digitized by Gallica 
Annalen der Physik - History

Physics journals
Publications established in 1790
Wiley-VCH academic journals
English-language journals
Publications established in 1799
Monthly journals